Renaissance is the seventh studio album by American disco group Village People, released in 1981 by RCA Records. The album marked a departure for the group, with a more new wave-influenced sound and less of an emphasis on disco.

Background

In 1980, the Village People had starred in the motion picture Can't Stop the Music, but the film was released after disco's peak and was subsequently a box office flop, even winning the first ever Razzie Award for Worst Picture. The group was signed to Casablanca Records, but when the label went out of business, RCA signed the group in 1981 with plans to rebrand them as a new wave band. David Hodo, the "construction worker", recalled in a 2014 interview with PopMatters that the RCA executives were "passing around ideas" for how to re-style the group. One idea was for each member to wear a colorful, monochromatic fringed leather bodysuit, which Hodo deemed "awful". The second look that the label proposed, which the group agreed to, was a "New Romantic look, which was [like] Adam Ant and Spandau Ballet. That was the better of the two choices."

The group's former lead singer, Victor Willis, had departed several years before, and lead vocals were now performed by alternating members of the group.

Reception

Critical
In a review for Billboard magazine, the editors praised the album's "mellifluous harmonies" and commended the lead single, "5 O'Clock in the Morning", as "an ethereal piece of work", but criticized the album as "not edifying". 

In retrospective reviews, Stephen Thomas Erlewine of AllMusic gave the album one star out of five and deemed it an "embarrassment that never should have seen the light of day", further opining that the album, despite its age, "lacks kitsch value", but singling out "5 O'Clock in the Morning" as a highlight of the album. Christopher Bickel of Dangerous Minds retrospectively deemed "Food Fight" a "stupefying punk rock masterpiece", comparing its style to Devo and "Weird Al" Yankovic, and opined that, "had the Village People followed Renaissance with an album full of songs in the 'Food Fight' vein, they easily could have been the greatest fake punk band of all time."

Commercial
"5 O'Clock in the Morning" became the group's first hit single in Italy.

Track listing
All tracks written by Jacques Morali, V.P. Band, Henri Belolo and Dennis Frederiksen.

Side one
"Do You Wanna Spend the Night" – 3:34
"5 O'Clock in the Morning" – 5:03
"Fireman" – 5:00
"Jungle City" – 3:45

Side two
"Action Man" – 2:35
"Big Mac" – 2:26
"Diet" – 3:19
"Food Fight" – 2:34

Charts

References

1981 albums
Village People albums
Albums produced by Jacques Morali
RCA Records albums
Casablanca Records albums